The 2007 FIRS Intercontinental Cup was the tenth edition of the roller hockey tournament known as the Intercontinental Cup, played on March 24, 2007, at Follonica, Italy. Follonica Hockey won the cup, defeating Concepción PC.

Match

See also
FIRS Intercontinental Cup

References

International roller hockey competitions hosted by Italy
FIRS Intercontinental Cup
2007 in roller hockey
2007 in Italian sport